MEO 245 were an Australian new wave band which formed in 1978 in Hobart, Tasmania with Paul Brickhill on keyboards, guitar and vocals; Campbell Laird on drums; Paul Northam on guitar and vocals; and Mick Wilson on bass guitar. Wilson was replaced on bass guitar by Mark Kellett, who in turn was replaced by Anthony Moore. The group issued a sole studio album, Screen Memory (August 1981), which reached the top 100 of the Kent Music Report Albums Chart.

History 

MEO 245 were a pop rock band formed as Guided Tour in Tasmania by Paul Brickhill on keyboards, guitar and vocals; Campbell Laird on drums; Paul Northam on guitar and vocals; and Mick Wilson on bass guitar. The group's name, MEO 245, refers to a catalogue number of a German Import extended play released by the Beatles. In February 1979 they relocated to Melbourne where Wilson was replaced on bass guitar by Mark Kellet.

The band signed with Mushroom Records and in October 1980 they issued their debut single, "Lady Love". The singles, "Lady Love" and "Other Places" (July 1981), made the mainstream charts in Australia. The group appeared on ABC TV's pop show, Countdown, performing "Lady Love" and "Jewels" (October 1981).

From May to July 1981 they recorded their first album, Screen Memory (August 1981), with Peter Dawkins (Air Supply, Dragon, Mi-Sex) producing at  Studios 301, Sydney. It reached No. 69 on the Kent Music Report Albums Chart. According to Australian musicologist, Ian McFarlane, "[the] title was taken from A Critical Dictionary of Psychoanalysis and the record itself was full of English-influenced pop rock."

During April and May 1982 they recorded a six-track EP, Rites of Passage (September 1982), at Richmond Recorders with co-production by the group and John French (he also worked as its audio engineer). It provided two singles, "Sin City" (also September) and "Summer Girl" (November). It was a marked shift from the new wave pop of Screen Memory with a more guitar-orientated sound coming to the fore.

Ahead of the EP's release Kellet left and was replaced on bass guitar by Anthony Moore. In January of the following year Brickhill left to join Little Heroes and the group disbanded by March with Laird joining Soldier of Fortune and Northam going to Luxury Device.

Screen Memory, Rites of Passage and the non-album single, 'Lady Love", were released on CD as Screen Memory / Rites of Passage, for a compilation album in 1997 by Mushroom Records.

Discography

Albums

Extended plays

Singles

References 

 Retro Universe Blog
 Mushroom Evolution Concert - MEO 245 Live ℗ 2009 Liberation Music

Australian new wave musical groups
Australian pop rock groups
Musical groups established in 1978
Musical groups disestablished in 1983
Tasmanian musical groups